Dayrolles Blakeney Eveleigh-de-Moleyns, 4th Baron Ventry, DL, JP (22 January 1828 – 8 February 1914), was an Irish hereditary peer, elected as a representative peer in 1871.

Lord Ventry was the son of Thomas de Moleyns, 3rd Baron Ventry. In 1860, he married Harriet, daughter of Andrew Wauchope of Niddrie Marischal. They had five sons and four daughters.

 Hon. Mildred Rose Evelyn Eveleigh-de Moleyns (d. 11 October 1949); she married Alexander Fuller-Acland-Hood, 1st Baron St Audries, and had children.
 Hon. Maud Helen Eveleigh-de Moleyns (d. 29 July 1934); she married John Gretton, 1st Baron Gretton, and had children.
 Lt.-Col. Frederick Rossmore Wauchope Eveleigh-de Moleyns, 5th Baron Ventry (11 December 1861 – 22 September 1923)
 Hon. Frances Elizabeth Sarah Eveleigh-de Moleyns (30 December 1862 – 8 July 1939), who married first Henry Francis Conyngham, 4th Marquess Conyngham, and had seven children. Secondly, she married Maj. John Russell Bedford Cameron and together had a daughter, Gretta.
Arthur William Eveleigh-de Moleyns, 6th Baron Ventry (6 April 1864 – 6 July 1936); married Evelyn Muriel Stuart Daubeny. They had two sons and a daughter
 Hon. Hersey Alice Eveleigh-de Moleyns (31 March 1867 – 3 April 1937); she married John Hope, 1st Marquess of Linlithgow, and had children.
 Hon. Edward Dayrolles Eveleigh-de Moleyns (31 May 1871 – 7 July 1930); unmarried.
 Lt. Hon. Richard Andrew Eveleigh-de Moleyns (13 June 1874 – July 1917)
 Lt. Hon. John Gilbert Eveleigh-de Moleyns (27 May 1878 – 4 January 1928); married Marguerite Noon. They had no known issue.

References
 'VENTRY’, Who Was Who, A & C Black, an imprint of Bloomsbury Publishing plc, 1920–2008; online edn, Oxford University Press, Dec 2007       accessed 11 Feb 2013
 The Times (London), Tuesday, 10 February 1914; pg. 11; Issue 40443. (282 words) 

1828 births
1914 deaths
Barons in the Peerage of Ireland
19th-century Anglo-Irish people
High Sheriffs of Kerry
Irish representative peers
Deputy Lieutenants of Kerry